Robert Edward Faught (September 2, 1921 – April 23, 2002) was an American professional basketball player. He played for the Cleveland Rebels of the Basketball Association of America (now known as the National Basketball Association).

High school career
Bob attended Cleveland Heights High School in Cleveland Heights, Ohio.

College career
Bob attended the University of Notre Dame in South Bend, Indiana.

Professional career
Bob played 51 games for the Cleveland Rebels during the 1946–47 BAA season.  When the Cleveland Rebels folded, Bob was drafted by the Philadelphia Warriors in the dispersal draft, but did not go on to play for the team.

BAA career statistics

Regular season

Playoffs

References

External links

1921 births
2002 deaths
All-American college men's basketball players
American men's basketball players
Basketball players from Ohio
Cleveland Rebels players
Notre Dame Fighting Irish men's basketball players
Forwards (basketball)
Cleveland Heights High School alumni